The 2017 Leinster Senior Football Championship was the 2017 installment of the annual Leinster Senior Football Championship organised by Leinster GAA.

Dublin were the defending champions, having won their 55th title and completed a 6-in-a-row in 2016. The draw for the championship was made on 13 October 2016.

Teams
The Leinster championship was contested by 11 of the 12 county teams in Leinster, a province of Ireland. Kilkenny was the only county team not to compete.

Championship Draw
The four teams who won the quarter-finals in the previous year were given byes to this year's quarter-finals.

Preliminary round

Quarterfinals

Semifinals

Final

See also
 2017 All-Ireland Senior Football Championship
 2017 Connacht Senior Football Championship
 2017 Munster Senior Football Championship
 2017 Ulster Senior Football Championship

References

External links
 http://www.leinstergaa.ie/

2L
Leinster Senior Football Championship